Kirk Jones may refer to:

 Sticky Fingaz (Kirk Jones, born 1973), American rapper
 Kirk Jones (director) (born 1964), English film director and screenwriter
 Kirk Jones, the last person to survive falling down Niagara Falls in 2003, in only his regular clothes. He later attempted the same stunt in 2017 in an inflatable ball and died.